Maurice Daly Ndour (born June 18, 1992) is a Senegalese professional basketball player for the Nagoya Diamond Dolphins of the Japanese basketball league. He played college basketball for the Ohio Bobcats and has represented the Senegalese national team, where he participated in the 2014 FIBA Basketball World Cup.

Early life
Ndour, a Senegalese native, was born in Sindia and raised in M'Bour where he played soccer and basketball as a youth. During his teenage years, he was noticed playing in a local basketball tournament and was asked if he'd like to play high school basketball in Japan. For his sophomore, junior and senior years, Ndour attended Okayama Gakugeikan High School where he was an all-Okayama MVP honoree and all-star selection in 2009 and 2010.

College career
After graduating from Okayama Gakugeikan in 2011, Ndour moved to the United States where he enrolled at Monroe College and played two seasons for the Mustangs. He was a two-time NJCAA All-Region selection and finished his two-year career at Monroe with 848 points, placing him eighth on the all-time Mustang scoring list. He averaged 9.4 points, 6.4 rebounds and 2.4 blocks per game as a freshman in 2011–12, and 16.2 points, 10.5 rebounds and 2.3 blocks per game as a sophomore in 2012–13.

In 2013, Ndour transferred to Ohio University where he spent his final two college seasons playing for the Bobcats. As a junior in 2013–14, he averaged 13.8 points and 7.0 rebounds in 36 games, and earned second-team All-Mid-American Conference and NABC All-District 14 second team honors. As a senior in 2014–15, he again earned second-team All-MAC honors after averaging 16.0 points, 8.3 rebounds and 2.3 blocks per game.

Professional career

Dallas Mavericks (2015)
After going undrafted in the 2015 NBA draft, Ndour joined the New York Knicks for the 2015 NBA Summer League. On July 23, 2015, Ndour signed with the Dallas Mavericks. He appeared in the team's first four preseason games but missed the final three games of the preseason schedule with a left tibial stress reaction. He was subsequently waived by the Mavericks on October 26 prior to the start of the regular season.

Real Madrid (2015–2016)
On December 5, 2015, Ndour signed a one-year deal with Real Madrid. In 12 league games for the club, he averaged 2.3 points and 1.8 rebounds per game. He also appeared in six EuroLeague games, averaging 1.7 points and 1.2 rebounds per game.

New York Knicks (2016–2017)
On July 14, 2016, Ndour signed with the New York Knicks. He made his debut for the Knicks on November 1, 2016, recording three points, two rebounds and one steal off the bench in a 102–89 loss to the Detroit Pistons. On April 4, 2017, in his first career start, Ndour had 13 points and 12 rebounds in a 100–91 win over the Chicago Bulls. Three days later, he scored a career-high 15 points in a 101–88 loss to the Memphis Grizzlies. During his rookie season, he had multiple assignments with the Westchester Knicks of the NBA Development League. On June 30, 2017, he was waived by the Knicks.

UNICS (2017–2019)
On November 29, 2017, Ndour signed with Russian club UNICS for the rest of the 2017–18 season. On August 6, 2018, Ndour re-signed with Russian club UNICS for one season with an option for 2019–20 season.

Valencia Basket (2019–2020)
On July 16, 2019, Ndour signed a one-year deal with Spanish club Valencia Basket. He averaged 6.3 points and 2.4 rebounds per game. Ndour was released from the team on July 8, 2020.

Rytas Vilnius (2020–2022)
On October 16, 2020, Maurice Ndour signed with Rytas Vilnius for a one-year deal.

Galatasaray (2022)
On February 3, 2022, he has signed with Galatasaray Nef of the Basketbol Süper Ligi (BSL).

Career statistics

NBA Regular season

|-
| style="text-align:left;"| 
| style="text-align:left;"| New York
| 32 || 4 || 10.6 || .453 || .143 || .731 || 2.0 || .3 || .5 || .3 || 3.1
|-
|- class="sortbottom"
| style="text-align:center;" colspan=2| Career
| 32 || 4 || 10.6 || .453 || .143 || .731 || 2.0 || .3 || .5 || .3 || 3.1

G League 

|-
| style="text-align:left;"| 2016-17
| style="text-align:left;"| Westchester Knicks
| 18 || 18 || 28.1 || .469 || .276 || .779 || 6.8 || 1.2 || 1.1 || 1.4 || 14.7
|-
|- class="sortbottom"
| style="text-align:center;" colspan=2| Career
| 18 || 18 || 28.1 || .469 || .276 || .779 || 6.8 || 1.2 || 1.1 || 1.4 || 14.7

European leagues

|-
| style="text-align:left;" | 2015–16 EuroLeague
| style="text-align:left;" |  Real Madrid
| 6 || 0 || 8.0 || .555 || .000 || .000 || 1.2 || .2 || .5 || .2 || 1.7 || 1.3
|-
| style="text-align:left;" | 2017–18 EuroCup
| style="text-align:left;" |  BC UNICS
| 12 || 0 || 17.6 || .418 || .333 || .722 || 4.2 || .8 || 1.3 || .6 || 5.1 || 6.6
|-
| style="text-align:left;" | 2018–19 EuroCup
| style="text-align:left;" |  BC UNICS
| 18 || 10 || 21.0 || .537 || .000 || .843 || 4.2 || .7 || 1.1 || 1.2 || 9.6 || 11.5
|-
| style="text-align:left;" | 2019–20 EuroLeague
| style="text-align:left;" |  Valencia Basket
| 26 || 12 || 15.0 || .585 || .400 || .806 || 2.4 || .4 || .9 || .3 || 6.3 || 7.0

Domestic leagues 

|-
| style="text-align:left;" | 2015-16
| style="text-align:left;" |  Real Madrid
| style="text-align:left;" | Liga ACB
| 12 || 9.6 || .500 || .500 || .636 || 1.7 || .0 || .4 || .7 || 2.3
|-
| style="text-align:left;" | 2017-18
| style="text-align:left;" |  BC UNICS
| style="text-align:left;" | VTB United League
| 22 || 20.7 || .669 || .500 || .864 || 4.7 || .8 || 1.1 || .6 || 10.4
|-
| style="text-align:left;" | 2018-19
| style="text-align:left;" |  BC UNICS
| style="text-align:left;" | VTB United League
| 22 || 22.6 || .549 || .250 || .781 || 4.9 || 1.2 || .9 || 1.0 || 10.4
|-
| style="text-align:left;" | 2019-20
| style="text-align:left;" |  Valencia Basket
| style="text-align:left;" | Liga ACB
| 19 || 16.8 || .443 || .188 || .825 || 3.7 || .6 || .6 || .5 || 6.0
|-
| style="text-align:left;" | 2020-21
| style="text-align:left;" |  Zhejiang Golden Bulls
| style="text-align:left;" | CBA
| 11 || 19.6 || .659 || .000 || .550 || 6.1 || 1.0 || 1.6 || .8 || 11.1
|-
| style="text-align:left;" | 2020-21
| style="text-align:left;" |  Rytas Vilnius
| style="text-align:left;" | LKL
| 5 || 26.4 || .667 || .429 || .762 || 6.0 || 1.0 || 1.2 || .4 || 17.4
|-
| style="text-align:left;" | 2021-22
| style="text-align:left;" |  Rytas Vilnius
| style="text-align:left;" | LKL
| 7 || 17.7 || .569 || .333 || .706 || 3.1 || 1.4 || .5 || 1.1 || 11.4
|-
| style="text-align:left;" | 2021-22
| style="text-align:left;" |  Galatasaray S.K.
| style="text-align:left;" | Basketbol Süper Ligi
| 9 || 28.4 || .667 || .000 || .806 || 5.7 || 1.5 || .8 || 1.5 || 13.4

Personal life
Ndour is the son of Anne Marie Dione and Robert Diegane Ndour. He has a brother, Bruno, step brother, Marcelin, and step sister, Madeleine. Ndour is fluent in five languages, including English, French, Japanese, Wolof and Serer.

References

External links
Maurice Ndour at acb.com
Ohio Bobcats bio

1992 births
Living people
2014 FIBA Basketball World Cup players
2019 FIBA Basketball World Cup players
BC UNICS players
Centers (basketball)
Galatasaray S.K. (men's basketball) players
Junior college men's basketball players in the United States
Liga ACB players
Monroe Mustangs men's basketball players
National Basketball Association players from Senegal
New York Knicks players
Ohio Bobcats men's basketball players
People from Thiès Region
Power forwards (basketball)
Real Madrid Baloncesto players
Senegalese men's basketball players
Senegalese expatriate basketball people in Japan
Senegalese expatriate basketball people in Russia
Senegalese expatriate basketball people in Spain
Senegalese expatriate basketball people in the United States
Sportspeople from Thiès
Undrafted National Basketball Association players
Westchester Knicks players